Star Commander is a 1983 card game published by Historical Concepts.

Gameplay
Star Commander is a game in which the object is to be the first player to command a complete, fully crewed fleet of starships.

Reception
Scott Haring reviewed Star Commander in Space Gamer No. 70. Haring commented that "Other than the low quality of the components, there's very little bad to say about Star Commander. It's easy to learn and features plenty of player interaction. I and my friends have played it over and over again, and we still enjoy it."

Reviews
Asimov's Science Fiction v8 n3 (1984 03)
Isaac Asimov's Science Fiction Magazine

References

Card games introduced in 1983